The 1976–77 UNC Charlotte 49ers men's basketball team represented the University of North Carolina at Charlotte in the 1976–77 college basketball season. This was head coach Lee Rose's second season at Charlotte. The 49ers competed in the Sun Belt Conference and played their home games at the original Charlotte Coliseum. They finished the season 28–5 (5–1 in Sun Belt play) and won the Sun Belt tournament to receive a bid to the 1977 NCAA tournament. The 49ers would defeat Central Michigan, No. 6 Syracuse, and No. 1 Michigan to reach the Final Four (to date, the only appearance in school history). Charlotte lost a 2-point game to the eventual national champion, Marquette, in the national semifinals before falling to UNLV in the consolation game.

Roster

Schedule and results

|-
!colspan=9 style=| Regular season

|-
!colspan=9 style=| Sun Belt tournament

|-
!colspan=9 style=| NCAA tournament

Rankings

Awards and honors
Cedric Maxwell – Sun Belt Conference Player of the Year
Lee Rose – Sporting News Coach of the Year, Sun Belt Conference Coach of the Year

Players in the 1977 NBA Draft

References

Charlotte 49ers men's basketball seasons
Charlotte
Charlotte
NCAA Division I men's basketball tournament Final Four seasons
Charlotte 49ers men's basket
Charlotte 49ers men's basket